Peter Geisler is a German clarinetist. He was a member of the Berlin Philharmonic Orchestra and Scharoun Ensemble. He plays on an Öhler system clarinet.

Discography
Mozart: 6 Notturni; Divertimenti, with various artists. Orfeo, 1991.
Mozart: Divertimenti, KV166, KV186, with various artists. Orfeo, 1994.

References

Living people
German clarinetists
Year of birth missing (living people)
Place of birth missing (living people)
21st-century clarinetists